Bruma parvus is the only species in the monotypic moth genus Bruma of the family Erebidae. It is known from North Sumatra in Indonesia. Both the genus and the species were first described by Michael Fibiger in 2010.

The wingspan is 9–10 mm. The head, patagia, anterior part of the tegulae, prothorax, basal part of the costa, costal part of the medial area and the terminal area, including the fringes are black. The costal medial area is quadrangular. The forewing ground colour is brown, suffused with few black scales. The crosslines are indistinct and beige. The terminal line is marked by black interneural dots. The hindwing is light grey, with an indistinct discal spot. The underside of the forewing is grey brown, while the underside of the hindwing is grey, with a discal spot.

References

Micronoctuini
Noctuoidea genera
Taxa named by Michael Fibiger